Good Luck to Our Boys in Tan  is a song written in 1919 by E.S.S. Huntington and published by Eva Rendall Richardson.

References 

Bibliography
Crew, Danny O. “Presidential Sheet Music: An Illustrated Catalogue of Published Music Associated with the American Presidency and Those Who Sought the Office”. Jefferson, North Carolina: McFarland, 2001.  
Parker, Bernard S. “World War I Sheet Music: 9,670 Patriotic Songs Published in the United States, 1914-1920, with More Than 600 Covers Illustrated. Jefferson, N.C.: McFarland, 2007.

External links 
 Sheet music and song MP3 at the Illinois Digital Library

1919 songs
Songs of World War I